Inula hookeri, Hooker's inula or Hooker's fleabane, is a species of flowering plant in the sunflower and daisy family Asteraceae.

The specific epithet hookeri commemorates the plant hunter Sir Joseph Hooker, who brought it back from the Himalayas to Britain in 1849.

Description
Each inflorescence comprises a disc of many needle-like yellow ray florets surrounding a raised central boss of deeper yellow disc florets.

References

hookeri
Flora of Bhutan
Flora of China
Flora of Myanmar
Flora of Nepal